Zwarts is a surname. Notable people with the surname include:

Frans Zwarts (born 1949), Dutch linguist
Joël Zwarts (born 1999), Dutch footballer
Kim Zwarts (born 1955), Dutch photographer
Moshé Zwarts (1937–2019), Dutch architect

See also
Zwart

Dutch-language surnames